Dầu Tiếng is a rural district of Bình Dương province in the Southeast region of Vietnam. As of 2003, the district had a population of 92,592. The district covers an area of 720 km². The district capital lies at Dầu Tiếng township.  

The district had a base with the same name during the war in Vietnam. Dầu Tiếng Base Camp played a prominent role in the fighting around northern III Corps.  On 23 February 1969, the NVA launched a large scale attack on the base to coincide with their Tet 1969 campaign.

See also
Dau Tieng Solar Power Project

References

Districts of Bình Dương province